The Children and Social Work Act 2017 (c. 16) is an Act of the Parliament of the United Kingdom.

The Act was passed by the Conservative Government in 2017, having been launched in 2016 in the House of Lords by Parliamentary Undersecretary of State for the School System Lord Nash, and guided through the House of Commons by Edward Timpson MP, who was then Minister for Children and Families. The Bill was published with no prior public consultation.

Provisions of the Act included the creation of Social Work England as the regulator for social workers. This non-departmental public body took up its role in December 2019.

References

External links 
 Children and Social Work Act 2017 (as revised) at legislation.gov.uk

Acts of the Parliament of the United Kingdom concerning England and Wales
United Kingdom Acts of Parliament 2017
Children's rights in England